William Henry Ball (11 April 1876 – February 1929) was an English footballer who played as a full-back. Born in West Derby, Liverpool, he played for Liverpool South End, Rock Ferry, Blackburn Rovers, Everton, Notts County and Manchester United.

References

External links
MUFCInfo.com profile

1876 births
1929 deaths
Footballers from Liverpool
English footballers
Association football fullbacks
Liverpool South End F.C. players
Rock Ferry F.C. players
Blackburn Rovers F.C. players
Everton F.C. players
Notts County F.C. players
Manchester United F.C. players
English Football League players
People from West Derby